Reutte-Höfen Airfield is a recreational airfield near Reutte, Tyrol, Austria.

See also
List of airports in Austria

References

External links 
 Airport record for Reutte-Höfen Airport at Landings.com

Airports in Austria
Buildings and structures in Tyrol (state)
Transport in Tyrol (state)